Tove Alsterdal (born 28 December 1960) is a Swedish journalist, playwright, screenwriter and crime fiction writer. Her awards include the Best Swedish Crime Novel Award and the Glass Key award.

Career
She has worked as journalist, playwright and screenwriter, and has been editor of several of Liza Marklund's books. She wrote the script for Helena Bergström's film  from 2009, and the libretto for Fredrik Högberg's opera Woman of Cain.

She made her crime novel debut in 2009, with Kvinnorna på stranden. Her novel Låt mig ta din hand was awarded the Best Swedish Crime Novel Award in 2014. Her novel Rotvälta was awarded the Best Swedish Crime Novel Award in 2020, and the Glass Key award in 2021.

Personal life
Born on 28 December 1960 in Malmö, Alsterdal grew up in Stockholm and Umeå.

References

1960 births
Living people
People from Malmö
Swedish journalists
Swedish dramatists and playwrights
Swedish screenwriters
Swedish crime fiction writers
Swedish women writers